Walter Caprile  (born July 25, 1973 in Canelones) is a former Uruguayan footballer.

Club career
Caprile began his career in Uruguay playing for Cerro and played for several seasons in the Primera División Uruguaya, before moving to clubs in Honduras and Guatemala. He also had a spell with Trikala in the Greek Super League.

References

1973 births
Living people
Uruguayan footballers
C.A. Cerro players
Liverpool F.C. (Montevideo) players
Racing Club de Montevideo players
C.A. Bella Vista players
Real C.D. España players
F.C. Motagua players
Trikala F.C. players
Expatriate footballers in Greece
Expatriate footballers in Guatemala
Expatriate footballers in Honduras
Liga Nacional de Fútbol Profesional de Honduras players

Association football midfielders